Bosom Friend is a Chinese language bimonthly celebrity and women's magazine published in Wuhan, China. The magazine is among the leading titles in the country. The title of the magazine is a reference to the idiom "bosom friend" which means a very close friend.

History and profile
Bosom Friend was established in Wuhan in 1985. The magazine is part of Bosom Friend Publishing Group and is published by Bosom Friend Publishing on a bimonthly basis. During its early period the magazine was published monthly and then biweekly. As of 2004 its publisher was the Hubei Women's Federation.

Bosom Friend was described by Chen Peiqin as aiming at lonely and undereducated Chinese housewives as well as elderly people living in small towns. Hu Xunbi is both the founder and the editor-in-chief of the magazine, who launched its Hong Kong edition in 2005.

Circulation
Bosom Friend had a circulation of 1.7 million copies in 1987. In 1994 it was the sixth largest magazine by advertisement revenue in China. The circulation of the magazine was 1,280,000 copies in 1996.

The magazine sold 4,269,000 copies in 2000. In 2001 it was the fifth best-selling general interest magazine worldwide with a circulation of 4,230,000 copies. In 2003 Bosom Friend was the third best-selling magazine in China and its circulation was 2,450,000 copies. In 2006 it was the largest fourteenth magazine worldwide with a circulation of 2,500,000 copies. In January 2010 the magazine sold 3,150,000 copies.

References

1985 establishments in China
Bi-monthly magazines published in China
Biweekly magazines
Celebrity magazines
Chinese-language magazines
Magazines established in 1985
Mass media in Wuhan
Monthly magazines published in China
Women's magazines published in China